The Cardenales de Lara is a baseball team in the Venezuelan Professional Baseball League. Founded in 1942 and based in Barquisimeto, the Cardenales have won six domestic titles, including back-to-back in 1998 and 1999, and 2019 and 2020.

Current roster

Died on or before December 31, 2020 in a motorcycle accident. R.I.P 1995-2020

Notable players

  Luis Aponte
  Jesse Barfield
  Miguel Cairo
  Giovanni Carrara
  Tony Castillo
  Alcides Escobar
  Kelvim Escobar
  Tom Evans
  Cecil Fielder
  /   Shawn Green
  Roy Halladay
  Félix Hernández
  Alexis Infante
  César Izturis
  Luis Leal
  Fred Manrique
  Brandon Morrow
  Joc Pederson
  Robert Pérez
  Scott Pose
  Luis Sojo

References

External links
 Official Page

Baseball teams in Venezuela
Baseball teams established in 1942
1942 establishments in Venezuela
Sport in Barquisimeto